Ji Lee is a Communication Designer at Facebook, and former designer and creative director at the Google Creative Lab, who is known for his illustrations and public-art projects. He also teaches at the School of Visual Arts.

Early life
Lee was born in Seoul, South Korea, in 1971. He moved to Brazil when he was 10, and later came to New York City to study at Parsons School of Design. He ended up graduating with a degree in communication and graphic design.

Among the works of public art he is known for is the Bubble Project: Mr. Lee printed 50,000 stickers that look like speech bubbles used in comic strips. He then posted these blank speech bubbles on top of advertisements throughout New York City allowing anyone who sees them to write in their comments and thoughts. In 2006, Mr. Lee wrote a book about the project called Talk Back:The Bubble Project which talks about the blank bubbles which transformed the corporate monologue into a true public dialogue.

Mysterabbit
Lee was also one the founders of the project Mysterabbit where a small white coloured rabbit was placed anonymously in over 19 different countries around the world. The rabbit is 3D Printable and there are photos available on their Mysterabbit website.

Redundant Clock
In 2015, Lee started a crowdfunding project on Kickstarter, called “Redundant Clock”, which was successfully funded. In 2019, Lee collaborated with Hong Kong independent watchmaker Anicorn Watches to make “Redundant Watch”, which was also a crowdfunding project on Kickstarter.

References

External links
Ji Lee's personal website

The Bubble Project
Mysterabbit Official Website
Ji Lee's Kickstarter project - Redundant Clock
Ji Lee & Anicorn Watches's Kickstarter project - Redundant Watch

1971 births
Culture jamming
Living people
Google employees
American people of Korean descent
People from Seoul